The Awakening is the thirteenth studio album by the American power metal band Kamelot. The album was released on March 17, 2023 via Napalm Records. It is the band's first studio album in five years, following 2018's The Shadow Theory, making this the longest gap between two studio albums by Kamelot.

It is the first studio album to feature Alex Landenburg on drums following the departure of Johan Nunez.

Background
Following the tour for The Shadow Theory, Youngblood revealed in June 2020 that he, Karevik and Palotai were working on new material for the upcoming thirteenth Kamelot album.

Youngblood also revealed that a number of twenty-five songs had been written for the new album, focusing on only thirteen of them. Although the album was supposed to be released in March 2020, both Youngblood and Karevik had also stated that the band planned to release the new album in August or September 2021. Youngblood confirmed the number of twelve songs for the album and that the band were going to the studio to record their thirteenth studio album, as well as confirmed that the album will contain a mixture of both old and new elements and influences.

Kamelot announced that they had produced two music videos for the album in May 2022, following the 2021 deadline being passed. In the following month, the band finished the mixing for the album, later planning its release for an early 2023 release. Cellist Tina Guo was later announced that she would be a featured guest on the album.

Track listing

Personnel
All information from the album booklet.

Kamelot
 Tommy Karevik – vocals, engineering
 Thomas Youngblood – guitars
 Sean Tibbetts – bass
 Oliver Palotai – keyboards, engineering, choir vocals
 Alex Landenburg – drums, percussion

Additional personnel
 Michael Rodenberg – additional keyboards, arrangements on "Midsummer's Eve"
 Kobra Paige – additional vocals on "One More Flag in the Ground"
 Brian Howes – backing vocals on "One More Flag in the Ground"
 Tina Guo – cello (tracks 5 and 6)
 Florian Janoske – violin on "Midsummer's Eve"
 Simone Simons – guest vocals on "New Babylon"
 Melissa Bonny – guest vocals on "New Babylon"
 Oliver Hartmann – backing vocals
 Herbie Langhans – backing vocals
 Ina Morgan – backing vocals

New Babylon Choir
 Chris Fenske
 Svenja Kehder

Crew
 Jacob Hansen – mixing, mastering
 Sascha Paeth – production, engineering, additional guitars, vocals
 Giannis Nakos – artwork
 Karl Dicaire – engineering
 Phil Hillen – engineering

References

2023 albums
Kamelot albums
Napalm Records albums